Orhun Ene (born 1 February 1967 in Erzurum, Turkey) is a Turkish former professional basketball player and coach. He is the current head coach for Bahçeşehir Koleji of the Turkish Basketbol Süper Ligi (BSL).During his playing career, at a height of 1.88 m (6'2") tall, he played at the point guard position.

Professional playing career
During his club career, Ene won 3 Turkish League championships (1988, 1989, 1995), the Turkish Cup (1992), and 2 Turkish Supercups (1988, 1995).

National team playing career
Ene was a member of the senior Turkish national team. With Turkey, he won a silver medal at the 2001 EuroBasket. He also played at the 1993 EuroBasket, the 1995 EuroBasket, and the 1997 EuroBasket.

Coaching career
Ene was named the head coach of the senior Turkish national team in 2011, after Bogdan Tanjević's departure from the position.

Personal life
Ene is married to former women's basketball player Zeynepgül Ene, who for a long period of time, played with Galatasaray Istanbul Women. He is the uncle of Derin and Mina Ene. He owns a boat named Natasha.

References

External links
FIBA Player Profile
FIBA Europe Player Profile
TBLStat.net Player Profile
EuroCup Coach Profile

1967 births
Living people
Antalya Büyükşehir Belediyesi coaches
Banvit B.K. coaches
Basketbol Süper Ligi head coaches
Darüşşafaka Basketbol coaches
Eczacıbaşı S.K. (men's basketball) players
Fenerbahçe men's basketball players
Galatasaray S.K. (men's basketball) players
İstanbul Teknik Üniversitesi B.K. players
Paşabahçe S.K. players
Point guards
Tofaş S.K. coaches
Turkish basketball coaches
Turkish men's basketball players
Turkey men's national basketball team coaches
Ülker G.S.K. basketball players